Ferlemann is a surname. Notable people with the surname include:

 Enak Ferlemann (born 1963), German politician
 Erwin Ferlemann (1930–2000), German trade unionist